Fallstaff is a neighborhood in the Upper Park Heights area of Northwest Baltimore, Maryland, and is one of the city's northwesternmost communities. The area, which is mostly middle class, is part of the center of Baltimore's Orthodox Jewish community, and also has a heavy African-American and immigrant population.

Fallstaff is home to several Baltimore City Public Schools, including Northwestern High School and Fallstaff Elementary Middle School (formerly Fallstaff Middle School).

The main street that run through the area is Park Heights Avenue in Pikesville. Other streets include Fallstaff Road, on which both schools are located, and Clarks Lane. Fallstaff Road is mostly a residential side street on which duplexes, single-family houses, apartments, and condominiums are located. One block of Fallstaff Road is one way in order to reduce traffic from rat running. On the other hand, Clarks lane, which also is lined with similar types of structures, is two ways throughout and handles more traffic. Clarks Lane starts out across from the Reisterstown Road Plaza (sharing a traffic light with the parking lot) and continues to the city/county line, where it changes name to Sanzo Road, and ends shortly thereafter at Smith Avenue.

Slayings in May 2004
Fallstaff is generally considered to be a safe, low-crime area. But in May 2004, the murders of three children shook up the community and resulted in ongoing media coverage. Two relatives were charged with the murders, and their first trial resulted in a mistrial. They were convicted in their second trial and received life sentences. The children were buried in their native Mexico.

Now through all the years since 2004, Fallstaff has been a quiet, low-crime area and consider to be safe near West Baltimore County.
Blue Police Light cameras are available starting at Fallstaff Road to Reistertown Road.
(Which began in 2005)

Fallstaff Road

Located in the Fallstaff area, the road is not too far from Baltimore County. The road starts as a one-way street at Crest Heights Road, then a two-lane road towards Northwestern School, although there is a 2-way stop, motorists that are going slight right will bring motorist to Cross Country Boulevard. Fallstaff ends at Willow Glen Drive in Baltimore County. Cross Country Boulevard has another road to the right after passing Greenspring Avenue to Rogers Avenue. Motorists going straight will bring them to Kelly Avenue in Mount Washington which is North Baltimore to Falls Road (crossing the Kelly Avenue bridge and I-83). Most of the area is a historical area. While traveling in that area, an MTA Light Rail station is available on Smith Avenue, but motorists must take Sulgrave Avenue and then Newbury Street to get to the Light Rail station.

See also
 List of Baltimore neighborhoods

References

External links 
 Northwest District Maps
Collection of Baltimore Sun articles on Fallstaff slayings
 Fallstaff Improvement Association, Inc.  - a community association serving this area

 
Jewish communities in the United States
Jews and Judaism in Baltimore
Neighborhoods in Baltimore
Orthodox Jewish communities
Orthodox Judaism in Baltimore